Kristoffer Ødemarksbakken (born 15 December 1995) is a Norwegian footballer who plays for 1. divisjon club Aalesund .

He hails from Maura, and moved from minnows Nannestad to the youth section of larger neighbors Ull/Kisa ahead of the 2012 season. One year later he was allowed to train with the senior team. The head coach was Arne Erlandsen, and Erlandsen again signed Ødemarksbakken ahead of the 2018 season. In his Eliteserien debut on home ground, Ødemarksbakken scored a goal and was declared man of the match by VG.

Career statistics

Club

References

External links

1995 births
Living people
People from Nannestad
Norwegian footballers
Ullensaker/Kisa IL players
Lillestrøm SK players
Aalesunds FK players
Norwegian First Division players
Eliteserien players
Association football midfielders
Sportspeople from Viken (county)